Masjid Al-Iman (Jawi:مسجد الإيمان; English: Al-Iman Mosque) is a mosque in Bukit Panjang, Singapore. The four level mosque building was opened on 2 May 2003 and officiated by Minister-in-Charge of Muslim Affairs Yaacob Ibrahim on 19 September 2004.

Transportation
The mosque is accessible from Bangkit LRT station and nearby bus stops that operate bus numbers 922, 920 and 976.

See also
 Islam in Singapore
 List of mosques in Singapore

References

External links
Majlis Ugama Islam Singapura, MUIS (Islamic Religious Council of Singapore)
List of Mosques in Singapore managed by MUIS : Masjid Al-Iman
 GoogleMaps StreetView of Masjid Al-Iman

2003 establishments in Singapore
Bukit Panjang
Mosques completed in 2003
Iman